Landry may refer to:

People
 Landry (surname), of French origin
 Landry Jones (born 1989), American football player
 Landry Fields (born 1988), American basketball executive
 Landry Shamet (born 1997), American basketball player

Places
 Landry, Savoie, a French town in the Savoie département

Art, entertainment, and media

Fictional characters
 Landry (Sanrio character), fictional boy raccoon created by the Japanese toy company Sanrio
 Landry Clarke, Matt Saracen's best friend in the Friday Night Lights television series
 Landry du Lauzon, the protagonist of the television series Knightfall

Enterprises
 Landry's Restaurants, American corporation that develops restaurants and hospitality projects

Other uses
 Saint Landry (disambiguation)